Leopoldia is a genus of bulbous perennial plants  in the family Asparagaceae, subfamily Scilloideae. The genus is widespread around the Mediterranean region and neighboring lands, from the Canary Islands to Iran.

Leopoldia species were formerly included in the genus Muscari (as the Leopoldia group or subgenus), and like muscari are often called grape hyacinths. Their flowers are arranged in a spike or raceme with those at the top more brightly coloured than those lower down.

Description
Leopoldia can be distinguished from Muscari by being generally taller plants and having more open spikes or racemes of flowers, caused by the individual flowers being spaced further apart. The lower fertile flowers are relatively long, often urn-shaped or tubular and are white, yellow, green or brown but never blue; they have distinct 'shoulders' close to the mouth of the flower, which is smaller than the general diameter of the flower and surrounded by small lobes or "teeth" formed by the ends of the fused tepals. The colour of the lobes is a diagnostic feature in identifying species. At the top of the raceme there is usually a tuft of bright violet, blue or pink sterile flowers.

Taxonomy
In 1819, William Herbert was the first to use Leopoldia as the name of a genus; it was proposed as a provisional name (nomen provisorium) for the genus he later (in 1821) called Hippeastrum. Although Leopoldia was subsequently validated (i.e. it became the correct name for Hippeastrum), this was overlooked, and Hippeastrum rather than Leopoldia was used for the genus of New World amaryllids. In 1845, Filippo Parlatore independently proposed Leopoldia for a group of species he separated from Muscari. In 1970, Fabio Garbari and Werner Greuter proposed that Parlatore's Leopoldia should be conserved and Herbert's Leopoldia rejected. This was accepted and Leopoldia Parl. is now a conserved name (nomen conservandum), and so the correct name for the genus described here.

Species
, the World Checklist of Selected Plant Families accepts 12 species:

 Leopoldia bicolor (Boiss.) Eig & Feinbrun, 1947 - Egypt, Israel, Palestine, Lebanon, Syria
 Leopoldia caucasica (Griseb.) Losinsk., 1935 - Caucasus, Turkey, Iraq, Iran
 Leopoldia comosa (L.) Parl., 1847 - Mediterranean and Europe from Canary Islands to Iran, north to Great Britain, Denmark, Poland, Ukraine; naturalized in South Australia and in parts of the USA
 Leopoldia cycladica (P.H.Davis & D.C.Stuart) Garbari, 1972 - Greece including Greek Islands
 Leopoldia eburnea Eig & Feinbrun, 1947 - Egypt, Palestine, Israel
 Leopoldia ghouschtchiensis Jafari & Maassoumi, 2011 - Iran
 Leopoldia gussonei Parl., 1857 - Sicily
 Leopoldia longipes (Boiss.) Losinsk., 1935 - from the Caucasus south to Sinai and the Persian Gulf
 Leopoldia maritima (Desf.) Parl., 1845 - North Africa and southwest Asia from Morocco to Iran; also Crimea
 Leopoldia tenuiflora (Tausch) Heldr., 1878 - from Germany and Italy east to Ukraine, Iran, Saudi Arabia
 Leopoldia tijtijensis Jafari, 2012 - Iran
 Leopoldia weissii Freyn, 1878 Greece, Turkey

Uses
L. comosa bulbs are pickled and eaten in Iran under the name of "moosir" (موسیر) (or 'Shallot yogurt'),  in Greece under the name of "volvoi" (βολβοί), meaning "bulbs", and in the Basilicata and Apulia region of Italy, under the names of "lampascioni", "lampasciuni", and "lamponi". They are included in the Ark of Taste catalogue of heritage foods.

References

Scilloideae
Asparagaceae genera
Edible plants